Fontannesia is an ammonoid cephalopod genus with a small to medium size, evolute, discoidal shell that was extant during the Jurassic Period. The sides are ribbed, the venter has a single median keel, and tubercles are lacking.

Fontannesia is included in the Sonniniidae (Hildoceratoidea) and has been found widespread in Europe, western Australia, Canada, and Argentina.

References

 Arkell et al., 1957., Mesozoic Ammonoidea, Treatise on Invertebrate Paleontology Part L, Ammonoiea.  Geological Society of America and University of Kansas Press.

Ammonitida genera
Sonniniidae
Jurassic ammonites
Ammonites of Australia